The Bank of the Iroquois Building, at the corner of Washita and Quapaw Sts. in Iroquois, South Dakota, was built in 1887.  It was listed on the National Register of Historic Places in 2002.

It is Italianate in style.  It has also been known as Farmers and Merchants Bank and as Hoevet Funeral Home.  It is a two-story brick building on a foundation built of granite, quartzite and limestone cobbles.  It has a flat roof with parapet.

References

Bank buildings on the National Register of Historic Places in South Dakota
Italianate architecture in South Dakota
Commercial buildings completed in 1887
Kingsbury County, South Dakota